The 2010 Houston Texans season was the franchise's 9th season in the National Football League and the 5th under head coach Gary Kubiak.  The Texans claimed their first winning season in franchise history, with a 9–7 record in 2009, but narrowly missed the playoffs. The Texans selected Kareem Jackson CB from Alabama, with the 20th overall all pick in the 2010 NFL Draft. In 2010, the team started the season on a 4–2 record going into a Week 7 bye week, but promptly collapsed 2–8 in the second part of the season, finishing 6–10.

The Texans gave up 427 points to opponents (26.2 points per game), second-most in the AFC and fourth-most in the entire league. Football statistics site Football Outsiders states that the Texans' defense had allowed the highest percentage of plays with broken tackles in the league, allowing a broken tackle on 8.1% of defensive plays. FO also calculated that Houston had the #2 offense in the league per play (adjusted for strength of opponent), but the second-worst defense (also adjusted). In their final eight losses, the Texans allowed an average of just under 30.4 points per game.

Undrafted second year running back Arian Foster led the NFL in rushing in 2010 with 1,616 yards. Foster had rushed for 257 yards in six games the season before.

Offseason

Coaching changes
 On January 6, Kyle Shanahan was hired as the new offensive coordinator of the Washington Redskins, shortly after his father, Mike Shanahan, was hired as the new head coach of the Redskins. One week later (January 13), the Texans hired former longtime Denver Broncos offensive assistant Rick Dennison as Kyle Shanahan's replacement.
 On January 12, assistant head coach/offensive line coach Alex Gibbs was hired to the same position with the Seattle Seahawks.

NFL draft

Staff

Roster

Preseason

Regular season

Schedule

Note: Intra-division opponents are in bold text.

Standings

Division

Conference

Game summaries

Week 1: vs. Indianapolis Colts

Starting lineups: HOUSTON – OFFENSE: QB Matt Schaub, LT Duane Brown, LG Wade Smith, C Chris Myers, RT Antoine Caldwell, RG Eric Winston, WR Andre Johnson, RB Arian Foster, FB Vonta Leach, TE Owen Daniels, WR Kevin Walter. 

The Texans began their season with a home game against the Indianapolis Colts, a division rival in which they had only beaten once ever. However, Houston got off to an early 13–0 lead after 30 and 49-yard field goals from Neil Rackers (who had recently replaced Kris Brown as the team's kicker) and a 22-yard touchdown pass from Matt Schaub, leading passer in the league a year ago, to Kevin Walter. As expected, the Colts wouldn't go down without a fight as Indy scored ten unanswered points to close out the half on a 14-yard touchdown pass from Peyton Manning to Reggie Wayne and a 20-yard field goal by Adam Vinatieri. With the momentum seemingly shifting to Indianapolis, Houston took nearly eight minutes off the third-quarter clock with a 15-play drive (13 rushes) out of the locker room, as Arian Foster scored from a yard out, his first of three touchdowns on the day. Going into the fourth with Houston leading 20–10, the Texans continued to run, and the Colts continued to pass, as Peyton Manning attempted 57 passes that day, completing 40, a career-high. However, it wouldn't be enough; even though the Colts scored two touchdowns on a 10-yard pass to Dallas Clark and a 73-yard pass to Austin Collie, the Texans would score two of their own: 25 and 8-yard runs from Arian Foster en route to a 34–24 Houston win at Reliant Stadium. Arian Foster finished with 231 rushing yards on 33 carries. Both were Houston records for a game, and the 231 yards was the second most rushing yards on opening week, only behind O. J. Simpson. Peyton Manning eventually went 40/57 for 433 yards and three touchdowns. Houston began the season 1–0 and won for only the second time against Indianapolis, against fifteen losses. The Colts, after going 0–4 in the 2010 preseason, lost their fifth game overall to start the 2010 year.

Week 2: at Washington Redskins

Hoping to maintain their winning streak the Texans flew to FedExField for an Interconference duel with the Redskins. In the first quarter The Texans trailed early as kicker Graham Gano got a 41 and a 27-yard field goal. In the second quarter the Texans replied and took the lead with QB Matt Schaub completing a 5-yard TD pass to WR Jacoby Jones, but fell behind again when RB Clinton Portis got two 1-yard TD runs to put the Redskins up 20–7. The Texans tried to cut the lead in the third quarter as kicker Neil Rackers nailed a 47-yard field goal, but the Redskins increased their lead with QB Donovan McNabb completing a 22-yard TD pass to TE Chris Cooley. The Texans then went on a scoring rally to successfully cut the lead when QB Matt Schaub made a 6-yard TD pass to WR Kevin Walter, followed in the 4th quarter by Rackers making a 43-yard field goal. Then Schaub threw a 34-yard TD pass to WR Andre Johnson. The Texans pulled out the overtime victory, their first in franchise history, when Rackers booted a 35-yard field goal to win the game for the Texans by the score of 30–27.

With the win, Houston improved to 2–0.

Week 3: vs. Dallas Cowboys

Hoping to increase their winning streak the Texans played on home ground for an Inter-conference duel with the Cowboys. Houston took the early lead in the 1st quarter when kicker Neil Rackers hit a 24-yard field goal. Then they fell behind with RB Marion Barber getting a 1-yard TD run, followed by kicker David Buehler's 49-yard field goal. The Texans struggled further in the third quarter when QB Tony Romo completed a 15-yard TD pass to WR Roy E. Williams. Houston replied with Rackers nailing a 30-yard field goal, but Dallas continued to score when Romo found Williams again on a 63-yard TD pass. Then David Buehler made a 40-yard field goal. The Texans would finally score when QB Matt Schaub made a 7-yard TD pass to WR Kevin Walter.

With the loss, the Texans fell to 2–1.

Week 4: at Oakland Raiders

Hoping to rebound from their loss to the Cowboys the Texans flew to Oakland–Alameda County Coliseum for an AFC duel with the Raiders. The Texans took the early lead in the 1st quarter as RB Derrick Ward got a 33-yard TD run. The Raiders replied with RB Michael Bush making a 2-yard TD run. The Texans got the lead back when QB Matt Schaub completed an 11-yard TD pass to TE Joel Dreessen. The Raiders responded in the 2nd quarter with QB Bruce Gradkowski getting a 13-yard TD pass to FB Marcel Reece. In the 3rd quarter the Texans started to rally with RB Arian Foster making a 74-yard TD run, followed by kicker Neil Rackers getting a 35-yard field goal, then in the 4th quarter Schaub threw a 10-yard TD pass to RB Arian Foster. The lead was cut with Gradkowski found TE Zach Miller on a 14-yard TD pass, and kicker Sebastian Janikowski nailing a 39-yard field goal.

With the win, the Texans improved to 3–1.

Week 5: vs. New York Giants

Coming off their win over the Raiders the Texans played on home ground for an Interconference duel with the Giants. In the first quarter the Texans trailed early when QB Eli Manning made a 6-yard TD pass to WR Hakeem Nicks. Then RB Brandon Jacobs got a 1-yard TD run. This was followed in the 2nd quarter by Manning finding Hicks again on a 12-yard TD pass. The Texans tried to cut the lead when kicker Neil Rackers hit a 38-yard field goal, which was responded by Lawrence Tynes' 45-yard field goal. The Texans' offense managed to break through in the third quarter when RB Derrick Ward got a 1-yard TD run, but was closed off after Tynes made a 42-yard field goal; followed by Manning completing a 4-yard TD pass to WR Steve Smith.

With the loss, Houston fell to 3–2.

Week 6: vs. Kansas City Chiefs

Hoping to rebound from their loss to the Giants the Texans played on home ground for an AFC duel against the Chiefs. In the first quarter the Chiefs took the early lead with QB Matt Cassel getting a 2-yard TD pass to OLB Mike Vrabel. The Texans responded and tied the game with QB Matt Schaub making a 5-yard TD pass to TE Joel Dreessen. The Chiefs rallied with Cassel making a 17 and then a 42-yard TD pass to WR Dwayne Bowe in the 3rd quarter. The Texans replied with RB Derrick Ward getting a 38-yard TD run. Then kicker Ryan Succop made a 24-yard field goal to put the Chiefs up 24–14. In the fourth quarter the Texans closed the gap with RB Arian Foster making a 2-yard TD run, but the Chiefs tried to pull away with RB Thomas Jones getting an 11-yard TD run. However, the Texans replied and eventually snatched the win with Foster making a 1-yard TD run, and then with Schaub finding WR Andre Johnson on an 11-yard TD pass.

With the win, Houston went into their bye week at 4–2.

Week 8: at Indianapolis Colts

Starting lineups: HOUSTON – DEFENSE: DE Antonio Smith, DT Shaun Cody, DT Amobi Okoye, DE Mario Williams, LB Brian Cushing, LB Kevin Bentley, LB Darryl Sharpton, CB Glover Quinn, CB Kareem Jackson, SS Bernard Pollard, FS Eugene Wilson.

Coming off their bye week the Texans played at Lucas Oil Stadium for an AFC South division rivalry match against the Indianapolis Colts. In the first quarter the Texans trailed early as QB Peyton Manning completed a 2-yard TD pass to TE Jacob Tamme. The Texans struggled further in the 2nd quarter when Matt Schaub's pass was intercepted by CB Kelvin Hayden and returned 25 yards for a touchdown. They soon responded with kicker Neil Rackers nailing a 53-yard field goal. The Texans fell further behind with kicker Adam Vinatieri getting a 48-yard field goal. This was followed in the third quarter by Manning throwing a 15-yard TD pass to WR Reggie Wayne. The Texans' offense broke through with Schaub connecting to WR Andre Johnson on a 28-yard TD pass. The Colts replied with Vinatieri hitting a 23-yard field goal. The Texans tried to fight back but only came away with a touchdown after RB Arian Foster got a 6-yard TD run. The Colts closed the game with Vinatieri making a 36-yard field goal.

With the loss, Houston fell to 4–3.

Week 9: vs. San Diego Chargers

Starting lineups: HOUSTON – OFFENSE: QB Matt Schaub, LT Duane Brown, LG Wade Smith, C Chris Myers, RG Mike Brisiel, RT Eric Winston, WR Andre Johnson, RB Arian Foster, FB Vonta Leach, TE Joel Dreessen, WR Kevin Walter. HOUSTON – DEFENSE: LDE Antonio Smith, DT Shaun Cody, DT Amobi Okoye, RDE Mario Williams, SLB Kevin Bentley, MLB Brian Cushing, WLB Zac Diles, CB Glover Quinn, CB Kareem Jackson, SS Bernard Pollard, FS Eugene Wilson.

The Texans' eighth game was an AFC duel with the Chargers. In the first quarter the Texans took the early lead as RB Arian Foster got an 8-yard TD run. The Chargers replied with QB Philip Rivers making a 55-yard TD pass to WR Seyi Ajirotutu. The Texans led again with kicker Neil Rackers nailing a 27-yard field goal, but fell behind after Rivers got an 11-yard TD pass to TE Randy McMichael. They took the lead in the second quarter as Foster made a 2-yard TD run, followed by Rackers hitting a 21 and a 25-yard field goal. The Texans lost the lead with Rivers finding McMichael again on a 12-yard TD pass. This was followed in the 4th quarter by Rivers' 28-yard TD pass to Ajirotutu (With a successful 2-point conversion as FB Mike Tolbert ran to the endzone).

With the loss, Houston fell to 4–4.

Week 10: at Jacksonville Jaguars

The Texans' ninth match was an AFC South rivalry match against the Jaguars at EverBank Field. In the first quarter the Texans trailed early as kicker Josh Scobee hit a 38-yard field goal. They replied after kicker Neil Rackers made a 24-yard field goal. They trailed again in the 2nd quarter with RB Maurice Jones-Drew getting a 3 and a 9-yard TD run. However, the lead didn't last long after RB Arian Foster got a 1-yard TD run, and QB Matt Schaub threw a 9-yard TD pass to WR Andre Johnson. The Jaguars stayed in the lead when QB David Garrard completed a 52-yard TD pass to TE Zach Miller, but the Texans replied again with Schaub finding WR Kevin Walter on an 18-yard TD pass. Suddenly, the Texans' defense broke through with only a few seconds remaining after Garrard made a 50-yard TD pass to WR Mike Thomas. The ball was batted into his hands by Texans Defensive back Glover Quin, who made an attempt to bat the ball to the ground.

With the loss, the Texans fell to 4–5.

Week 11: at New York Jets

Starting lineups: HOUSTON – OFFENSE: QB Matt Schaub, LT Duane Brown, LG Wade Smith, C Chris Myers, RG Mike Brisiel, RT Eric Winston, WR Andre Johnson, RB Arian Foster, FB Vonta Leach, TE Joel Dreessen, WR Kevin Walter. HOUSTON – DEFENSE: LDE Antonio Smith, NT Shaun Cody, DT Amobi Okoye, RDE Mario Williams, SLB Brian Cushing, MLB Kevin Bentley, WLB Darryl Sharpton, LCB Glover Quinn, RCB Kareem Jackson, SS Bernard Pollard, FS Eugene Wilson.
In an attempt to break a three-game losing streak the Texans flew to New Meadowlands Stadium for an AFC duel with the Jets. In the first quarter the Texans trailed early as kicker Nick Folk nailed a 37-yard field goal. They replied in the second quarter with RB Arian Foster getting a 2-yard TD run. The Texans struggled further as QB Mark Sanchez threw a 4-yard TD pass to WR Santonio Holmes; followed by Folk making a 30-yard field goal. The Jets' lead extended in the third quarter with Sanchez found Holmes again on a 41-yard TD pass. In the fourth quarter Folk made a 30-yard field goal to put the Jets up 23–7. The Texans rallied to take the lead back with kicker Neil Rackers nailing a 38-yard field goal, followed by QB Matt Schaub completing a 43-yard TD pass to TE Joel Dreessen, followed by Foster getting a 1-yard TD run, and then Rackers got a 22-yard field goal. The Texans' defense however broke through with Sanchez finding Holmes again on a 6-yard TD pass.

With the loss, Houston fell to 4–6.

Week 12: vs. Tennessee Titans

Starting lineups: HOUSTON – OFFENSE: QB Matt Schaub, LT Duane Brown, LG Wade Smith, C Chris Myers, RG Mike Brisiel, RT Eric Winston, WR Andre Johnson, RB Arian Foster, FB Vonta Leach, TE Joel Dreessen, WR Kevin Walter.
Hoping to snap a four-game losing streak the Texans played on home ground for an AFC South rivalry match against the Titans.  The Texans took control throughout the game as QB Matt Schaub got a 1-yard TD pass to TE Joel Dreessen, followed by his 2-yard TD pass to WR Andre Johnson. The lead was increased when kicker Neil Rackers hit a 35 and a 33-yard field goal.

With the easy win, the Texans improved to 5–6.  However, Johnson was ejected following a fight with Titans CB Cortland Finnegan, who was also ejected.

Week 13: at Philadelphia Eagles

Starting lineups:

HOUSTON – OFFENSE: QB Matt Schaub,
LT Duane Brown,
LG Wade Smith,
C Chris Myers,
RG Mike Brisiel,
RT Eric Winston,
WR Andre Johnson,
RB Arian Foster,
FB Vonta Leach,
TE Joel Dreessen,
WR Kevin Walter.
HOUSTON – DEFENSE: DE Antonio Smith, DT Shaun Cody, DT Amobi Okoye, DE Mario Williams, LB Brian Cushing, LB Kevin Bentley, LB Darryl Sharpton, CB Glover Quinn, CB Kareem Jackson, SS Bernard Pollard, FS Eugene Wilson.
Coming off their shutout win over the Titans, the Texans flew to Lincoln Financial Field for a Week 13 interconference duel with the Philadelphia Eagles on Thursday night.  Houston trailed early in the first quarter as Eagles quarterback Michael Vick completed a 1-yard touchdown pass to running back LeSean McCoy.  The Texans answered with a 48-yard field goal from kicker Neil Rackers, but Philadelphia struck back with McCoy getting a 4-yard touchdown run, followed by kicker David Akers getting a 36-yard field goal.  Houston replied with quarterback Matt Schaub finding wide receiver Jacoby Jones on an 8-yard touchdown pass.  The Eagles would close out the half with Akers making a 22-yard field goal.

The Texans took the lead in the third quarter with running back Arian Foster catching a 13-yard touchdown pass from Schaub and getting a 3-yard touchdown run.  Philadelphia regained the lead with Vick getting a 2-yard touchdown run, followed by his 5-yard touchdown pass to fullback Owen Schmitt.  Houston tried to rally, but the Eagles' defense prevented any progress.

With the loss, the Texans fell to 5–7.

Week 14: vs. Baltimore Ravens
Battle Red Day

Hoping to rebound from their road loss to the Eagles, the Texans went home, donned their alternate uniforms, and played a Week 14 Monday night duel with the Baltimore Ravens.  Houston trailed in the first quarter as Ravens running back Willis McGahee got a 1-yard touchdown run.  Baltimore added onto their lead in the second quarter as quarterback Joe Flacco completed a 9-yard and a 26-yard touchdown pass to wide receiver Derrick Mason.  The Texans would answer with quarterback Matt Schaub finding wide receiver Andre Johnson on a 46-yard touchdown pass.

The Ravens struck back in the third quarter as wide receiver David Reed returned the second half's opening kickoff 103 yards for a touchdown.  Houston continued to hang around with a 24-yard and a 42-yard field goal from kicker Neil Rackers.  The Texans tied the game in the fourth quarter as Schaub connected with wide receiver Jacoby Jones on a 7-yard touchdown pass, followed by a 5-yard touchdown pass to Johnson and a successful two-point conversion pass to Jones and the game headed to overtime.

The Ravens won the toss, but failed to advance the ball and punted to the Texans 9.  On the second play, Schaub's pass was intercepted by Josh Wilson, who ran untouched into the end zone.

With the loss, not only did Houston fall to 5–8, but they became the first team in NFL history to have four games where they have come back and either tie or the lead, only to end up losing the game.

Week 15: at Tennessee Titans

Hoping to break a two-game losing streak the Texans flew to LP Field for an AFC South rivalry rematch against the Titans. The Texans trailed early after QB Kerry Collins threw a 3 and a 1-yard TD pass to WR Nate Washington and to WR Justin Gage. This was followed by RB Chris Johnson getting an 11-yard TD run. The Texans got on the scoreboard after kicker Neil Rackers made a 37-yard field goal, but fell further behind after kkicker Rob Bironas hit a 30-yard field goal. The Texans tried to cut the lead with QB Matt Schaub getting a 12-yard TD pass to WR Andre Johnson, but the Titans would pull away with RB Javon Ringer getting a 7-yard TD run. The Texans tried to come back into the game, but only came away with Schaub throwing a 4-yard TD pass to WR Kevin Walter.

With the loss, the Texans fell to 5–9, and were officially eliminated from postseason contention.

Week 16: at Denver Broncos

The Texans' fifteenth game was an AFC duel with the Broncos. The Texans commanded the first half with RB Arian Foster getting a 3-yard TD run, followed by QB Matt Schaub getting a 3-yard TD pass to TE Owen Daniels, then with kicker Neil Rackers hitting a 34-yard field goal. The Broncos got on the board with RB Correll Buckhalter getting a 3-yard TD run, but the Texans scored again with Rackers nailing a 54-yard field goal. The Broncos replied as kicker Steven Hauschka got a 27-yard field goal, but the Texans extended their lead with Rackers hitting a 57-yard field goal. However, they failed to maintain this lead after QB Tim Tebow completed a 23-yard TD pass to Buckhalter, followed by Tebow scrambling 6-yards for a touchdown.

With the close loss, the Texans fell to 5–10.

Week 17: vs. Jacksonville Jaguars

The Texans' final game was a division rivalry rematch against the Jaguars.
The Texans took the lead as RB Arian Foster got a 2-yard TD run, followed by kicker Neil Rackers making a 26-yard field goal. The Jaguars responded with RB Rashad Jennings getting a 3-yard TD run, but Houston scored further as RB Derrick Ward made a 35-yard TD run. The Jaguars managed to tie the game with kicker Josh Scobee hitting a 39-yard field goal, followed by Edwards completing a 7-yard TD pass to Marcedes Lewis. However, the Texans pulled away from the tie with Rackers making a 33-yard field goal, followed by QB Matt Schaub completing a 5-yard TD pass to TE Owen Daniels, then with Foster getting a 35-yard TD run.

With the win, Houston ended their season with a 6–10 record.

Statistics

Team

Individual

Source:

References

External links
 Official website
 Houston Texans team page at NFL.com

Houston
Houston Texans seasons